Kerala State Electricity Board (KSEB) is an Indian public sector undertaking under the Government of Kerala that generates, transmits and distributes electricity in the state under government monopoly. Established in 1957, the agency comes under the authority of the Department of Power. It has been registered under Indian companies act during January 2011.

History

 The history of electricity in the state is around one century old. The first effort in this direction was a private endeavour. Electricity was first brought to the state by a British company – the Kannan Devan Hill Produce Company, Munnar. The first generating station of the state was set up on the right bank of a tributary of River Periyar in 1910. It was a hydroelectric project and that tributary named Mudirappuzha continues to be the site of large a number of hydroelectric projects in the state.
 After a spell of 17 years, the attention of the state authorities turned to newer forms of generating energy. The Government of Travancore set up a facility to supply electricity to the households of Thiruvananthapuram town. In 1927, a Thermal Power Station was established under government ownership at Thiruvananthapuram for production of electrical energy on commercial lines. Three oil engine generators, of a capacity of 65 kW each, were installed and commercial production started in 1929. This station was located at Thampanoor at Thiruvananthapuram. An Electrical Wing under the State Public Works Department was entrusted with the administration of the scheme.
 The next significant development was the formation of a separate department for electricity in 1932 by His Highness Sri Chithirathirunal Maharaja and his Diwan Sir C P Ramaswami Iyer. The formation of the Electricity Department paved the way for notable developments in the field. Thermal generating stations were set up at Kollam, Kottayam and Nagercoil (now in Tamil Nadu) in 1934. By that time, the possibilities of hydroelectric generation attracted the attention of the technologists and the authorities.
 Kerala being a land of mountains and rivers, it presented a fertile field for hydroelectric generation. The vast potential for hydroelectric generation in the state prompted the state authorities to take steps to establish stations for hydroelectric generation. The first of these ventures was the Pallivasal Hydroelectric Project, the construction of which was started in 1933. The first stage of the project was commissioned in 1940. Its capacity was 13.5 MW. By that time, a comparable electric transmission network had also been completed with 66 kV substations at Alappuzha, Mavelikkara, Kothamangalam, Kundara, Kalamasserry, Viyyur, Aluva, and Thiruvananthapuram, which were also commissioned in 1940 itself during April and May months
 The Kerala state Electricity board started functioning under the direction of a newly formed Kerala government, on 31 March 1957. The first governing body consisted of 5 members, and was headed by the chairman K P Sreedhara Kaymal. The staff of the erstwhile Department of Electricity of the Thiru-Kochi state were transferred to the KSEB.
 At the time of its inception, in 1958, the KSEB had an installed capacity of 109.5 MW, with a total annual internal generation of 441.35 MU. Over the years, as demand increased, the board has imported power from neighbouring states and private entities. As per the Central Electricity Act 2003, KSEB was converted to Kerala State Electricity Board Limited in 2014. The original KSEB was dissolved and its assets and liabilities transferred to the government initially and then transferred to the newly formed company KSEB Limited.

Organizational structure
The Kerala State Electricity Board, constituted by the Government of Kerala, by order dated 7 March 1957, under the Electricity (Supply) Act, 1948 is in the business of Generation, Transmission and Distribution of electricity and strives to provide quality electricity at an affordable cost to all classes of consumers in the state of Kerala.Kerala State Electricity Board commenced functioning on 31 March 1957 After Noon as per order no. EL1-6475/56/PW dated 7 March 1957 of the Kerala State Government. It had 5 members with Sri K P Sreedharan Nair as chairman. All the staff belonging to the erstwhile Electricity Department was transferred to the Board. The 'Board' consisting of the chairman and the Members is the Supreme Governing Body.

The State Government by their notification EL3-9345 dated 21 February 1958 constituted the State Electricity Consultative Council under section 16 of the Electricity Supply Act. The Council functions as consultative body and the Board is required to place before the council the annual financial statement and supplementary statements if any before submitting such statements to the State Government.
The 'Board' consisting of the chairman and the Members is the Supreme Governing Body. The Board consists of seven members and is headed by the chairman. The Government of Kerala and KSE Board issued orders for the restructuring of KSE Board into profit centers in April 2002. Members head the profit centers. There is a Corporate Office to coordinate and control the activities of the Board.

Since the enactment of the Electricity Act, 2003, KSEB has been functioning as the State Transmission Utility (STU) and a distribution licensee w.e.f 10 December 2004 under section 172(a) of the Electricity Act, 2003. The Central Government had approved the continuation of KSEB as a State Transmission Utility & Licensee only up to 24 September 2008. In exercise of the powers conferred under sub-sections (1), (2), (5), (6) and (7) of section 131 and section 133 of the Electricity Act 2003 (Central Act 36 of 2003) the Government of Kerala had issued notification vide G.O. (MS) No.37/2008/PD, Dated, Thiruvananthapuram, 25 September 2008 for the purpose of vesting of functions, properties, interests, rights, obligations and liabilities of the Kerala State Electricity Board in the State Government on such terms as agreed to by the Kerala State Electricity Board and the State Government and re¬vesting thereof by the State Government in a Corporate entity and also for the transfer of Personnel of the Board to the Corporate entity and for determining the terms and conditions on which such transfers and vesting shall be made. Accordingly, with effect from 25 September 2008, all the functions, properties and all interests, rights in properties, all rights, and liabilities of the Board are vested in the State Government. The Kerala State Electricity Board Limited has been incorporated under the Companies Act, 1956 on 14 January 2011 and started operations as independent company with effect from 1 November 2013. The original KSEB was dissolved and its assets and liabilities were transferred from government to the newly formed company KSEB Limited.

Generation

KSEB Ltd has 31 hydro-electric projects, 7 solar projects, 2 diesel power plants and 1 wind farm. Power generation is also undertaken by Captive Mode Projects, Independent Power Mode Projects & Co-generation mode projects other than KSEBL. About 25% of the energy requirement is being met from hydel plants owned and operated by KSEBL. As of December 2019, The total installed capacity was 2823.01 MW.

The below list contains power generation projects in Kerala owned by KSEB, Captive Mode Projects, Independent Power Mode Projects and co-generation mode projects.

Hydroelectric projects

Fossil fuel projects

Wind farms

Solar projects

Transmission
The Kerala power system grid is connected to the Southern Region Transmission system through 400 kV double circuit lines. They are
 Udumalpet – Madakkathara line
 Tirunelveli – Trivandrum line
 Mysore – Kozhikode (Areekode) line
 Tirunelveli - Kochi line
A 2000 MW HVDC Station has commissioned by Power Grid Corporation of India Ltd. at Madakkathara as part of Raigarh-Pugalur-Thrissur HVDC Project. This is the first HVDC Project in Kerala and the fourth project in South India after Kolar, Vizag and Pugalur. The project was inaugurated by Prime Minister Narendra Modi in February 2021.

There are 6 major inter-state transmission lines at 220 kV level and 110 kV level.

The 220 kV lines are:
 Kaniyampetta – Kadakola (single circuit)
 Idukki – Udumalpet (single circuit)
 Sabarigiri – Theni (single circuit)
 Edamon – Tirunelveli (double circuit)
The 110 kV lines are:
Parassala – Kuzhithura and
 Manjeswaram – Konake.
The major substations include five 400 kV substations, and 17 220 kV substations. The main grid comprises the 220 kV systems.
The transmission sector of KSEB comprises two zones namely North and South. The State Load Dispatch Centre (SLDC) located at Kalamassery.

400 kV substations at Pallipuram – Thiruvananthapuram, Pallikkara – Kochi, Palakkad, and Kozhikode are owned by PGCIL, while 400 kV substation at Madakkathara, Thrissur, is owned by KSEB. 400 kV substation, Madakkathara is the first 400 kV substation in Kerala.

Distribution

KSEB Ltd distributes electricity in the State of Kerala except in the administrative region of Thrissur Municipal Corporation and Munnar (Kannan Devan Hills). For operational conveniences the distribution wing is divided into four zones: South, Central, North and North Malabar.

Electricity tariff

Kerala State Electricity Board tariff consists of different components. The charges levied on consumers include fixed charges, meter rent, energy charges, fuel surcharges, electricity duty and applicable local taxes.

KSEB follows a slab system in which a consumer using up to 250 units per month will have a telescopic tariff. This means that the first 50 units will be charged at a lower rate, with the rates increasing progressively for subsequent 50 units. After 250 units, the billing will be "non-telescopic", which means the slab rate will be applicable for the entire electricity consumed.
The following table shows the electricity tariff for domestic consumers

Tariff for monthly consumption (up to 250 units)

For three-phase customers having a monthly consumption up to 100 units, the fixed charges are set as Rs 90 and Rs 100 for up to 250 units.

Tariff for monthly consumption (above 250 units)

For three-phase customers the fixed charges are set as Rs 110 for consumers having a monthly consumption up to 350 units, Rs 120 for up to 400 units, Rs 130 for up to 400 units and Rs 150 for consumption above 500 units.

See also
 List of electricity organisations in India
 Electricity sector in India
 List of power stations in India

References

External links
 
ORUMA: the result of KSEB’s concerted efforts: 'The Hindu'
Electricity Industry in Public Sector in India

Government-owned companies of Kerala
Energy in Kerala
State electricity agencies of India
1957 establishments in Kerala
Government agencies established in 1957